Tewkesbury is a local government district and borough in Gloucestershire, England. Named after its main town, Tewkesbury, the borough had a population of 85,800 in 2015. Other places in the borough include Ashchurch, Bishop's Cleeve, Churchdown and Winchcombe. It is administratively distinct from the parish of Tewkesbury, which is served by Tewkesbury Town Council.

It was formed on 1 April 1974, under the Local Government Act 1972, from the municipal borough of Tewkesbury, along with Cheltenham Rural District and part of Gloucester Rural District. Prior to assuming its borough charter the district was intended to be referred to as North Gloucestershire, and consultations have taken place in an attempt to change the name to avoid confusion with Tewkesbury proper.

Gloucestershire Airport is in the borough, near to Gloucester and Cheltenham. The borough is also served by Ashchurch for Tewkesbury on the mainline as well as a number of Gloucestershire Warwickshire Railway stations.

Tewkesbury Borough Council elects 38 Councillors from 20 wards. Following the May 2019 local elections, Tewkesbury Borough Council comprises 23 Conservative Councillors, 8 Liberal Democrat Councillors, 4 Brockworth First Councillors, 2 Tewkesbury and Twyning Independent Councillors and 1 Green Party Councillor. The leader of the council is Rob Bird, a Conservative, who has held the post since 2018. The borough mayor (a ceremonial role) for 2022–2023 is John Murphy.

Responsibilities
Tewkesbury Borough Council carries out a variety of district council functions including:
Benefits - Housing and Council Tax
Car Parking
Concessionary Travel
Council Tax - Administration and Collection
Elections and Electoral Registration
Environmental Health (includes Domestic and Commercial Premises)
Food Safety and Hygiene Complaints
Noise Pollution and Pest Control
Housing Administration
Licensing
Caravan Sites
Planning, including Planning Applications, Advice and Appeals
Public Conveniences (in some locales)
Health and Leisure Centres
Refuse Collection
Recycling
Tourism and Visitor Information.

Current Councillors

A total of 38 councillors are currently members of Tewkesbury Borough Council, with councillors grouping as part of the Conservative Party, Liberal Democrats, Brockworth First or Tewkesbury and Twyning Independents. As at June 2022 the councillors are:

References

External links
 Tewkesbury Borough Council

 
Non-metropolitan districts of Gloucestershire
Boroughs in England